S'Argamassa Roman Fish Farm can be found  eastwards along the coast from the town of Santa Eulària des Riu on the Spanish island of Ibiza. It is in the municipality of Santa Eulària des Riu. the Romans built this fish farm and connecting aqueduct following their occupation of the island in 146 BC.

History and location
The Romans arrived to occupy the island of Ibiza after defeating and destroying Carthaginian Empire in 146 BC. The island was granted confederate status within the Roman Empire and was known as Ebusus Federatae Civitae (Federation city of Ibiza). As a result of this, the island experienced a huge boost to its economy. Salt mining and agricultural activities brought great wealth to the island during this time.

Fishing industry
The islands economy also saw a huge growth in its fishing industry. The fishing technique of almadraba was used in the seas around the island. This used a labyrinth of nets and approximately fifty boats which channelled huge schools of fish, tuna being the main catch, into a holding area. The fish were then culled and dragged aboard the fishing boats. However these catches were so bountiful that not all the fish were killed. Some of the fish were kept alive in aquatic enclosures such as this one, along with a fish processing plant, built by the Romans at S'Argamassa.

Aqueduct
Leading to the processing plant on the coast, the Romans constructed an aqueduct to carry fresh clean water from a nearby stream to the processing plant. Part of this aqueduct can still be seen today. The conduit is built from large limestone slabs with a channel carved into the top surface. Unfortunately it is rather neglected these days but a  run of it can still be seen as it runs down to the coast alongside a modern hotel complex.

Production

When the fish surplus was brought to S'Argamassa, it was dealt with in two ways. The fish was filleted and then dried and salted. This product was called Salazón. The byproduct of the filleting process was used to produce the Roman delicacy of garum. Garum is a fish sauce which was consumed in great amounts in the Roman Empire. The heads, tails, gills, innards of the fish were first boiled and then macerated in salt, and cured in the sun for one to three months. The mixture fermented and liquefied in the dry warmth, with the salt inhibiting the common agents of decay. Garum was the clear liquid that formed on the top, drawn off by means of a fine strainer inserted into the fermenting vessel. The sediment or sludge that remained was allec. Concentrated decoctions of aromatic herbs might be added. Flavours would vary according to the locale, with ingredients sometimes from in-house gardens.

Fermentation tanks
At the end of the run of the aqueduct close to the shoreline there are the remains of rectangular structures which were once the fermenting tanks for the production of the garum. On completion of the process the sauce was packed into enormous earthenware storage jars called amphoras, also produced locally, and exported to all parts of the empire. The sauce was hugely popular condiment and was the ketchup or soy sauce
of its day.

Gallery

References

Archaeological sites in Ibiza
Roman fish processing
History of fishing
Santa Eulària des Riu
History of Ibiza
Ancient Roman buildings and structures in Spain
140s BC establishments